Aras may refer to:

Aras (mythology), an autochthon in Greek mythology, father of Araethyrea and Aoris
Ascending reticular activating system, in neuroanatomy
Archive for Research in Archetypal Symbolism
Aras GED, an Iranian industrial and environmental business consortium
Aras Corp, an American developer and publisher of product development software
Atherosclerotic renal artery stenosis, a kidney disease
ARAS (Lithuania), a Lithuanian Police special operations unit

Places 

Áras an Uachtaráin, the official residence of the President of Ireland, and by association the presidency itself
Aras, Navarre, a municipality in the autonomous community of Navarre (Navarra), Spain
Aras, Iran, a village in East Azerbaijan Province, Iran
Aras District, an administrative subdivision of Iran
Aras Free Zone, an industrial Zone situated in north-west of Iran, adjacent to Autonomous Rep. Nakhichivan, Armenia and Rep. Azerbaijan
Aras (river), a river that starts in Turkey and flows through Caucasia (borders Iran with Azerbaijan and Armenia)
Aras Dam, on the Aras River
Republic of Aras, a short-lived and unrecognized republic taking its name from the aforementioned river.
Årås, the administrative centre of Austrheim municipality in Vestland county, Norway
Ərəş, a village in Azerbaijan
Aras, Horasan

People 

Aras Baskauskas (born 1981), American yogi, musician, and reality TV personality
Aras Özbiliz (born 1990), Turkish-Armenian footballer
Murat Aras (born 1973), Turkish screenwriter
Tevfik Rüştü Aras (1883–1972), Turkish politician
Yıldız Aras (born 1977), Turkish karateka